BB Queen is the second studio album by Philadelphia-based rapper Bahamadia. BB Queen was released on July 25, 2000 through Good Vibe Recordings. BB Queen was Bahamadia's first release in four years, since her debut album, Kollage, which was released in 1996. The album peaked at number 25 on the Billboard Independent Albums Chart.

Critical reception

Matt Conaway of AllMusic gave the project 4 out of 5 stars, writing that "..the hypnotic lounge music of Jay Dee's soulful apprentices Dwele and EQ enables Bahamadia's subtle flow more of an opportunity to truly flourish [than on Kollage]."

Track listing
 BB Queen's Intro (feat. DJ Revolution)
 Special Forces (feat. Planet Asia, Rasco, Chops & DJ Revolution)
 Commonwealth (Cheap Chicks)
 One-4-Teen (Funky for You) (feat. Slum Village)
 Philadelphia (feat. Dwele)
 Beautiful Things (feat. Dwele)
 Pep Talk

Personnel
Bahamadia –	engineer, liner notes, mixing, primary artist, producer
Chops –	engineer, mixing, producer, vocals
DJ Drez –	engineer, producer
DJ Revolution –	engineer, guest artist, mixing, scratching
Planet Asia –	guest artist, vocals
Rasco –	guest artist, vocals
Slum Village –	guest artist, vocals
Dwele - guest artist, vocals, producer

Charts

References

Bahamadia albums